List of quiz channels.

South America

Argentina
Ring Caja
Llamá y Ganá

Brazil
Top Game
Agora é Hora
Hot Game
Desafio Show
Tela Interativa

Chile
Llama y Gana

Peru
Aquí se gana

Puerto Rico
Ring Ring Gana

Colombia
Ring Ring Gana
Aquí se Gana

North America 
Although there are no quiz channels in North America, these are interactive programs similar to quiz channels:

Canada
 Play TV (Global, Telelatino; produced by Telemedia InteracTV)
 The Quiz Hour - CHCH-DT (SPORT1 game show)
 Moneyquizzer - CHCH-DT
 Call TV (TQS / V; produced by MassResponse, subsidiary of Telekom Austria) - canceled
 L'Instant gagnant (TQS / V; produced by Telemedia InteracTV. (February 2012 – present)

Mexico
Marca y Gana & Tiempo de Ganar

United States
 My GamesFever (December 2006 - April 2007) (MyNetworkTV)
 Play2Win (August 2006 - March 2007) (Superstation WGN and WPIX-TV)
 PlayMania (April 2006 - February 2007) (GSN)
 100 Winners (February 2007 - June 2007)
 quiznation  (February 2007 - October 2007)
 Take the Cake (July 2007 - November 2007) (BET)
 Midnight Money Madness (August 2006 - October 2006) (TBS)
 GSN Live (February 2008–May 2011) (GSN)
Juegos PlayTV (Telemedia InteracTV game show

Europe

Belgium
The games started airing as from 2004.  In Flanders the main TV channels already banned the games between 2008 and 2010, except vtm and 2BE who stopped in 2011. In Wallonia the games are still broadcast.

The Belgian cabaret Neveneffecten had a TV-show Basta in January 2011 on channel Eén. In their second episode, Basta could prove these games were a fraud. Neveneffecten found a job posting as host for such games and they asked Maxime De Winne to apply for the job and to go undercover. De Winne got the job and was a host for about 4 months and used hidden cameras to record conversations with the management. Neveneffecten also hired a math expert: Gaeten de Weert. After some months, De Weert was able to solve every math puzzle, but noticed the answer of the puzzle is incorrect in 16% of the cases due to miscalculation of the producers. De Weert called the studio during a live game and was able to give the correct answer. He also said the show was a fraud and he was going to publish the solution key on the Internet, which he actually did. The episode was aired on 17 January 2011, vtm and 2BE decided to stop the games as from 20 January 2011.

The broadcast did not have effect in Wallonia although De Weert was also able to break the solution keys of the call games on these channels in August 2013. The games are no more aired since March 2014.

France
123 Quizz (Telemedia InteracTV game show)
No more call-tv shows are aired since 2007, these games are prohibited by the French law.

Germany
9Live, shut down 2011:
sixx: "Night-Loft" (produced by 9Live), cancelled 2010
Sat.1: "QUIZ NIGHT" (produced by 9Live), cancelled 2011
ProSieben: "ProSieben Night-Loft" (produced by 9Live), cancelled 2011
kabel eins: "kabel eins Filmquiz" (produced by 9Live), cancelled 2011
Das Vierte (subsidiary of NBC Universal), shut down 2013: 
"Hollywood Quiz" (produced by Mass Response), cancelled 2008
"Cash Quiz" (produced by Mass Response), cancelled 2009
"Spiel mit mir" (produced by 2am productions), cancelled 2009
"The Hotline" (produced by SPORT1), cancelled 2011
"FunDorado.com Late Night Show" (produced by SPORT1), cancelled 2011
RTL Group:
RTL: "Quiz-Night", cancelled
Super RTL: "Masterquiz", (produced by Mass Response) cancelled 2010
n-tv: "n-tv News Quiz", cancelled
K1010 TV, cancelled 2006
, shut down 2013:
"Glückspilz", cancelled 2012
"Goldene Zeiten", cancelled 2013
"Quizexpress" (produced by Telemedia InteracTV), cancelled 2013
MTV Central, Nickelodeon Germany, VIVA, Comedy Central Germany: "Money Express" (produced by Callactive (subsidiary of Endemol), later produced by Mass Response), cancelled in September 2008
Tele 5: "Bei Anruf - Spiel!", cancelled 2008
Star TV: "QuizExpress", cancelled 2014
Hallo TV: "Call2Win", cancelled 2014
SPORT1: "Sportquiz" (2003–present)
: "FolxQuiz" (2013–2021)

Till 2011, Sat.1, ProSieben and kabeleins had quick Quiz Shows, called "Quiz Breaks" or "Quiz Time". These Shows only lasted few minutes and interrupted TV-sitcoms like "Scrubs" in the morning to get viewers to call the phone numbers.

Shortly after adoption of the Rundfunkstaatsvertrag (broadcast treaty) in September 2008, which allows the regulators to impose fines to the channels in case of irregularity, several channels announced the end of phone-in quizzes.

Israel 
 Quiz Call (Me-tsal-tse-lim) (June 2007 - December 2008) (Channel 10)
 צלצול הכסף (Tsil-tsul Ha-ke-sef) (March 2008 - December 2008) (Channel 22 (Reshet))
 לילה לבן (Lai-la La-van) (2009-2010) (Channel 22 (Reshet))
  (July 2013 - February 2014) (Channel 10)

Netherlands
In the Netherlands, call-in quizzes were officially banned by law after losing all network support in November 2007. These programs were cancelled in the Flemish part of Belgium as from January 2011. De Neveneffecten revealed in their television show "Basta" fraud on large scale. The games are still aired in the Wallon part of Belgium.

Switzerland

:
"Swissquiz" (produced by PRIMAVERA TV), cancelled 2010
"Quizexpress" (produced by Telemedia Interac TV)https://web.archive.org/web/20140811214905/http://www.calltv.com/quizexpress/ - canceled - July 2014

"Quizexpress" (produced by Telemedia Hungary) http://www.calltv.com/quizexpress/- canceled 2014
TVM3:
"Sacré jeu !" (produced by Telemedia Hungary) http://calltv.com/sacrejeu/ - 2014 - October 10, 2021, canceled
"People Magazine" (produced by Telemedia Hungary) - canceled - 28 July - canceled 2014
S1 TV
"Quizexpress" (Telemedia InteracTV game show) July 2020 ‒ December 2020; canceled
Swiss1
"Moviequiz" (Telemedia InteracTV game show), April 1, 2022 - April 3, 2022; canceled

Czechia
Svůdná šance - TV Prima - 2003 - 2004 (Telemedia InteracTV game show)
Chytrý Prachy - TV Praha, TV Hradec Králové, TV Galaxie, Galaxie Sport - 2003 - 2004
Rychlá výhra - TV Prima - 2004 - ?; canceled (Telemedia InteracTV game show)
Nekonečná šance - TV Prima - 2005 - 2007 (Telemedia InteracTV game show)
Snadná výhra - TV Nova - 2006 - 2007; canceled
Sexy šance - TV Prima - 2008 (TV Prima game show)
Za kačku svlíkačku - Prima Cool - 2010 - 2014 (TV Prima game show)
Film kvíz - TV Barrandov - 2012 (Telemedia InteracTV game show)
Sexy Game/Music Game - Óčko group,  - 2012 - 2014; canceled (Telemedia InteracTV game show)
Kvíz (Telemedia InteracTV game show)-TV Pětka, TV Barrandov, Active TV - 2013 - 2014; canceled
Sexy Výhra - (Telemedia InteracTV game show) - Public TV, Stil TV, Šlágr TV, Active TV - 2010 - 2015; canceled
Sexy Šance (Telemedia InteracTV) - TV Pětka - 2012 - 2013
Ezo+ - TV Barrandov - 2011 - 2013, 2015 (Telemedia InteracTV game show)
Zavolej a poslouchej - TV Polar, V1 - 2013 (Telemedia InteracTV game show)
Ve hvězdách - TV Pětka - 2012 - 2013 (Telemedia InteracTV)
Sexy Výzva - Rebel, Relax, TIP TV, Kinosvět - 2013 - ? (TipTV production game show)
Sexy trefa - Prima Cool - 2014 (TV Prima game show)
Kvíz show - Prima Love - 2015 (TV Prima game show)
Chatlinka (Telemedia InteracTV game show)http://calltv.com/chatlinka/ - Active TV http://active-tv.cz/ , Barrandov TV group-  2015 - 2016; canceled
IQ kvíz - Rebel, Relax, Kinosvět - 2015 - 2018 (TipTV production game show)
Kvíz - UP Network - 2017
Linka lásky (Telemedia InteracTV game show) - TV Barrandov group, JOJ Family - 2015 - 2019; canceled
Eroskop (Telemedia InteracTV game show) -  - 2016 - 2018, 2020; canceled
Zavolej a vyhraj! (Telemedia InteracTV game show) -  - 2018; canceled
 (Telemedia InteracTV game show) - TV Barrandov group - 2015 – 2021 (with breaks); canceled
Kupuj a vyhraj (Telemedia InteracTV game show) - TV Barrandov group - (October 10, 2021 ‒ November 28, 2021) (with breaks); canceled

Romania

Câștigați Acum - Taraf TV (Telemedia InteracTV game show), (September 2021 – present); 
Cupoane Fantastice - Etno TV (Telemedia InteracTV game show), (October 2021 - November 2021) ; Monday-Friday 23:00-00:00 / Saturday-Sunday 14:15-15:00; cancelled

Hungary
Tantusz - Viasat 3 (2002) (Callactive game show)
10 Kvíz - Viva (2012) (Telemedia InteracTV game show)
Gazdagodj Okosan! - M1 (2005) (Telemedia InteracTV game show)
Tiszta kvíz - M1 (2008) (Telemedia InteracTV game show)
Játékhullám - Duna (2005)
Nyerő Bolt - ATV (Telemedia InteracTV game show), (January 3, 2022 – January 10, 2022), Monday-Sunday 22:45-23:45;cancelled
MentorCenter - ATV (Telemedia InteracTV game show), (January 14, 2022 – February 3, 2022), Monday-Sunday 22:45-23:45;cancelled

Croatia
Nova lova - NOVA TV (Telemedia InteracTV game show) -  Monday-Saturday 09:30-10:30; canceled 
Kunolovac - RTL TELEVIZIJA (produced by 9Live) - Sunday-Wednesday 00:00-02:00, Monday - Friday 09:15- 10:15; cancelled
Uzmi sve! - OTV (Telemedia InteracTV game show)  Monday - Sunday 19:00- 20:00; cancelled
Uzmi lovu! -  OTV, ZAGREBAČKA TELEVIZIJA-Z1(produced by Mass response), cancelled
Laka lova! - OTV, (produced by MAG - DRIVE d.o.o.), cancelled
Trezor! - ZAGREBAČKA TELEVIZIJA-Z1(produced by MAG - DRIVE d.o.o.), cancelled
Jackpot! - OTV, ( produced by Omega-produkcija d.o.o.), cancelled
Brzofon - Z1 (Telemedia InteracTV game show), July 2012 - August 2012
Zodijak+ - Z1 (Telemedia InteracTV game show), cancelled

Bosnia and Herzegovina
Dvostruka sansa - BN/BN Sat (Advantec Group DOO game show), Monday-Friday 16:18-17:15 / Saturday 14:30-16:00 (August 2008 - April 2009); cancelled
Kešolovac - OBN (Telemedia InteracTV game show), Monday - Friday 00:40- 02:40 (October 2008-February 2009); cancelled
Najbrži igrač - OBN (Telemedia InteracTV game show), July 2012-December 2012; May 2013-November 2013; cancelled
Pravi poziv - PinkBH (Telemedia InteracTV game show), July 2013 - October 2013; cancelled
Tele kviz - OBN (Go live produkcija game show), Monday-Friday 12:10-13:00 / Saturday 13:45-14:45 / Sunday 14:45-15:45 (December 2013 - January 2014); cancelled
Zlatna nit - OBN (Balkan Media game show), October 2015 - March 2016) ; Hayat TV/Hayat Plus (December 2017 - January 2018); cancelled
Ja znam - OTV Valentino/Pink Plus/BN Music/YU Planet Bec/TV 101 (Balkan Media game show), (February 2017 – July 2021), Monday-Sunday 17:00-18:00; cancelled
Najbrzi prsti - OBN (Old production game show), September 2017 - February 2018) Monday-Friday 12:05-13:05 / Saturday-Sunday 10:20-11:20; cancelled
 Isplati se - OBN (Euromedia D.O.O. game show), April 2018 - May 2018) ; BN/BN Sat (December 2019 - January 2020); cancelled
Znanje je imanje - OBN (101 Solutions D.O.O. game show), (October 2020 – November 2020), Monday-Sunday 11:10-12:00; cancelled
Vasa sansa - FACE TV (SMS VOICE PREMIUM SOLUTION game show)(October 2020 – November 2020), Monday-Thursday 17:00-18:45 /Friday-Sunday 14:20-15:50 / Monday-Sunday 00:05-02:00; cancelled ; Alfa TV (January 2021), Monday-Friday 13:40-14:40 / Saturday-Sunday 15:00-16:00; cancelled
Fonto - BN Music/OTV Valentino/P-TV Vienna/TV 101 (Balkan Media game show), (October 2021 – present), Monday-Sunday 17:00-17:30

Finland
Tiedä ja voita https://web.archive.org/web/20140812205320/http://tiedajavoita.com/index.php?page=rules - Nelonen 4,JIM and the radio station Metro Helsinki (Telemedia InteracTV game show) - 2014
Voittostudio http://voittostudio.com(produced by Telemedia InteracTV-Budapest)- MTV3 - SUB TV - 2014

Estonia
Mängi ja Võida - Kanal 2 / Kanal 11  (Telemedia InteracTV game show), (June 2019-August 2019); cancelled

Greece
Quiz make-r - MakedoniaTV  - Show banned and fined for misleading the public (produced by Telemedia InteracTV) - canceled 2014
ΕΙΣΑΙ Ο ΝΙΚΗΤΗΣ - Art TV - Show banned and fined for misleading the public (produced by Telemedia InteracTV)  -  canceled 2014
ΒΡΕΣ ΤΟ ΚΑΙ ΚΕΡΔΙΣΕ! - Art TV - Show banned and fined for misleading the public (produced by Teledia InteracTV) -  canceled 2014
Super game - Ant1 - Show banned and fined for misleading the public (produced by Telemedia InteracTV) - canceled 2014

Serbia
Lovac na novac - PINK (Telemedia InteracTV game show), Monday - Friday 09:05- 10:05, (May 2008 - April 2009); canceled
Usijanje - FOX (Telemedia InteracTV game show), (2008) Monday - Friday 11:05-11:55; canceled
Srećni poziv - b92 (Telemedia InteracTV game show), (February 2009 - May 2009); canceled
Najbrži igrač Srbije - Pink (Telemedia InteracTV game show), Monday - Sunday 12:02-12:50, (July 2013 - January 2014); canceled
Kviz - Pink Plus (Telemedia InteracTV game show), Monday - Friday 14:00- 15:00, (August 2013); canceled
Happy poziv - Happy (Telemedia InteracTV game show), Monday - Sunday 08:00-09:30, (September 2013 - October 2013); canceled
Vasa sansa - Super SAT TV / NTV Jasmin / TV Duga Plus (SMS VOICE PREMIUM SOLUTION game show) (November 2020 – February 2021), Monday-Sunday 17:00-19:00; canceled

North Macedonia
Brzi pari - Kanal 5 (Interactive Media Services Production game show), Monday - Friday 14:55-16:00 / Saturday 11:00-12:00; (July 2007 - January 2009); canceled
Ako znaes - Sitel (Capitol Media Group Production game show), Monday - Friday 12:30-14:00, (March 2008 - November 2008) (with breaks); canceled
Zlatna treska - Sitel (Capitol Media Group Production game show), Monday - Friday 19:50-20:00 / Sunday 19:10-19:30, (June 2008 - August 2008); canceled
Alo, alo... - Alfa (Capitol Media Group Production game show) Monday-Friday 11:00-12:00 (December 2008-July 2011) (with breaks) / Sky Net Monday-Sunday 17:00-18:45 (October 2010-December 2010); canceled
Trezor - A1 / A2 (Interactive Media Services Production game show), Monday - Friday 00:00-01:15 / 17:00-18:00 (November 2008-July 2009); canceled
Srekna zvezda - Kanal 5 (Capitol Media Group Production game show), Monday-Friday 14:30-15:30 / Saturday 11:00-12:00, (March 2009 - August 2011); canceled
Kërko de fito / Baraj i pobedi - Alsat M / Era (Capitol Media Group Production game show), (May 2009 - October 2009) (with breaks); canceled
Ostrovot na bogatstvoto - A1 (Interactive Media Services Group Production game show), Monday - Saturday; (June 2009 - March 2010) (with breaks); canceled
Golemiot kes - Kanal 5 (Capitol Media Group Production game show); Monday-Saturday 00:20-01:15, (October 2009 - April 2010); canceled
Arkë / Trezor - Alsat M  (Interactive Media Services Production game show); Monday-Friday 23:00-00:00, (October 2009 - February 2010); canceled
Nëse di di / Ako znaes - Alsat M (Interactive Media Services Production game show); Saturday-Sunday 17:00-18:00, (October 2009 - February 2010); canceled
Super zdelka - Kanal 5 (Interactive Media Services Production game show), (November 2009) Monday - Friday 12:00-13:00; canceled
Fërma e jone / Nasata farma - Alsat M (Interactive Media Services Production game show), (May 2010 - June 2010); canceled
Veselata farma - AB kanal (Interactive Media Services Production game show), (December 2010 - February 2011); canceled

Slovenia
Srečna linija - KANAL A (Telemedia InteracTV game show), canceled
Fantastični klic - KANAL A (Telemedia InteracTV game show), canceled
Pokliči in zadeni - PIKA TV (Telemedia InteracTV game show), canceled
Evromanija - KANAL A (Telemedia InteracTV game show), canceled
Zavrtite Uganite - TV3 Medias
Odpelji Škodo - GOLICA TV
Pokliči in zmagaj - PopBrio (Telemedia InteracTV game show), March 2014
Srečni klic - KANAL A (Telemedia InteracTV) - July 2014
Vem znam zmorem - Golica TV - 2013

Slovakia
Sexy výhra - Dajto, Ring TV http://dajto.markiza.sk/relacie/657940_sexy-vyhra (Telemedia InteracTV game show)-  canceled 2012 - 2014
Peniaze na ruku - Jednotka (Telemedia InteracTV game show) - 2005 - 2006
5 a pol - Dvojka (RTVS game show)
Riskni to s JOJ!/PLUS!/Riskuj s WAU! - JOJ, JOJ Plus, WAU (TV JOJ game show) - 2013 - 2015
Eurominuty - JOJ Plus, WAU https://web.archive.org/web/20140818204527/http://eurominuty.joj.sk/eurominuty-o-relacii.html (Telemedia InteracTV game show) - 2014 - 2016

Italy
VIP TV, canceled
 - La7, 2001–2002
Quizissimo - 7 Gold (Telemedia InteracTV game show), canceled
Notte D'Oro (Telemedia InteracTV game show), canceled
Quiz Line (Telemedia InteracTV game show), canceled

Poland
Tele Gra
Ale kasa! - Polsat (9Live game show), (2008)
Hit the Bank - TVN Lingua (TVN game show), (2007)
Podróże z zagadkami - TVP1 (Telemedia InteracTV game show), (2008)
Noc zagadek - TVP2 (Telemedia InteracTV game show), (2008 - 2009, 2010)
Zagadkowa jedynka - TVP1 (Telemedia InteracTV game show), (2010)
Zagraj w kabaret - TVP1 (Telemedia InteracTV game show), (2010)
Zagadkowa jedynka (Green Hat Studios) - TVP1 (? - 2017)
Wielka Wygrana (Telemedia InteracTV game show)
Wygraj fortunę (Telemedia InteracTV game show)
Wygraj teraz (Telemedia InteracTV game show)
Kasa na Bank (Telemedia InteracTV game show)
Kup і Wygraj - Polonia1 / Tele5 (Telemedia InteracTV game show), (February 10, 2022 – February 25, 2022), Monday-Fruday 13:05-13:40,canceled
Zagadkowy Weekend - Polonia 1 (AP Investment), (December 18, 2022 - present), Sunday 14:00-16:00

Portugal
Quando o Telefone Toca (SIC) adapted from Quizmania, produced by FremantleMedia Portugal (2007–2008)
Todos em Linha (SIC) adapted from The Mint, produced by FremantleMedia Portugal (2008–present)
Toca a Ganhar (TVI) produced by Llama TV (2007–2008)
Sempre a Somar (TVI) adapted from Take the Cake, produced by Endemol Portugal (2008–present)
Quem Quer Ganha (TVI) (2003–2010)
Agora é que Conta (TVI) (2010–2012)
Ora Acerta (TVI) (2014–present), produced by Telemedia InteracTV

Russia
Ночной клуб / Night Club (DTV Viasat)
Лови удачу / Catch Success (MTV Russia) (Telemedia InteracTV game show)
Деньги на проводе / Money For A Wire, Ночные игры / Night Games (TNT) (Telemedia InteracTV game show)
Культ наличности / Cult of cash, Киномания / Film-mania (TV-3)
Лёгкие деньги / Сheapjack (TV Stolica)
Ночной выигрыш / Night prize (7TV) (Telemedia InteracTV game show)
Поймай удачу /  Catch good luck (World Music Channel)
Быстрый и Умный - 8TV https://web.archive.org/web/20140813005336/http://8tv.ru/pdfdoc.pdf (produced by Telemedia InteracTV)- canceled August 2014
"Счастливчик на проводе"  Bridge Tv / Rusong Tv(Telemedia InteracTV game show) July 1, 2016 ‒ August 12, 2016; canceled

Spain
Llamada Interactiva - canceled
Adivina quién gana esta noche (Antena 3) produced by Llama TV - canceled
Llámame (Cuatro) produced by Llama TV - canceled
La llamada millonaria (Cuatro)- canceled
Contamos contigo  (Cuatro)- canceled
¡Uau! (Cuatro)- canceled
Marca y gana (Cuatro)- canceled
Llama y gana (Telecinco)- canceled
Telecinco ¿dígame? (Telecinco)- canceled
Noche de suerte (Telecinco)- canceled
Si lo aciertas, ganas (Telecinco)- canceled
Lluvia de euros (Telecinco)- canceled
Aprende Español (la Sexta)- canceled
Despierta y gana (laSexta)- canceled
Ganas de ganar (laSexta)- canceled
Gana ahora (laSexta)- canceled
TRUCA I ENCERTA (Telemedia InteracTV game show)(8 TV)- canceled
Llamar y Ganar (Telemedia InteracTV game show) (VEO TV)- canceled
 La Noche Es Tuya (Telemedia InteracTV game show) - Neox - (Jule 2018); canceled
 Llama y Gana (Telemedia InteracTV game show) - Hit TV - (June 2020); canceled
 Tiki Ticket (Telemedia InteracTV game show)- Ten Tv (June 24, 2022 – June, 30 2022);canceled

United Kingdom
Former Quiz Programmes & Channels

Avago
The Big Deal
Big Game TV
Bikini Beach
Cash Call (The Hits)
Cash House
Eureka
Glitterball (ITV)
Grab A Grand
ITV Play Channel
Play DJ (ITV)
Quiz Beat
Quiz Call (Five)
Quizmania
Quiz Nation (ITV)
Quiz Night Live (Ftn)
Quiz TV
Quiz World (Smile TV)
Sky Quiz Live (Sky One)
Sweet & Sassy
The Call (ITV)
The Daily Quiz (Big Game TV, ITV Play, Men & Motors)
The Great Big British Quiz
The Hallmark Channel Quiz (Hallmark)
The Mint (ITV Play)
Make Your Play (ITV)
This Morning Puzzle Book (ITV Play)
The Zone (ITV Play)
TV Bingo

Africa

Nigeria
Quiz Line

South Africa
Sms & Win - Etv (Telemedia InteracTV game show), (February  12, 2022 - present)

Asia

Philippines

123 Quizz

Iran

زنگ و پیر - Win tv - (Telemedia InteracTV game show), May 10 2021 – February 2022 ; cancelled

References

Quiz channels